Madang may refer to:

Regions

Papua New Guinea 
 Madang, capital of Madang Province
 Madang District
 Madang Province
 Madang Airport, airport in Madang

Other countries 
 Kampong Madang, a village in Brunei
 Madang, Burma, a village in Bhamo District, Kachin State, Burma
 Madang Road Station, a station of Shanghai Metro Line 9 in Shanghai, China

Theatres 
 Madangguk, a theatrical art in Korea

Other 
Artocarpus odoratissimus, a tropical plant sometimes known as madang